Higher education in Canada includes provincial, territorial, indigenous and military higher education systems.

Higher education systems in Canada

In Canada, the constitutional responsibility for higher education primarily rests with the provinces of Canada per the Constitution Act, 1867. The decision was contentious from its inception. As a result of this constitutional arrangement, a distinctive system of education, including higher education, has evolved in each province and territory. The federal government's direct involvement in higher education is currently limited to the Canadian Military Colleges and funding the education of aboriginal peoples.

The higher education systems in Canada's ten provinces include their historical development, organization (e.g., structure, governance, and funding), and goals (e.g., participation, access, and mobility). Each of the three territories in Canada (i.e., Nunavut, Northwest Territories, and Yukon) have separate higher education systems that reflect territorial history, organization, and goals in the context of geographical challenges.

Indigenous education
Higher education for the Aboriginal peoples of Canada can be considered on a spectrum ranging from Aboriginal to general programs and institutions. At one end, some institutions are specifically intended for Aboriginal people, located in predominantly Aboriginal communities, controlled by First Nations band governments or dedicated non-profit boards, and/or accredited by indigenous bodies (often international in scope). At the other end are the mainstream provincial or territorial systems with general intake. In the middle could be considered focussed programs chartered by provincial or territorial governments or affiliated to their mainstream institutions. (The spectrum does not consider programs outside Canada, whether indigenous-focussed or not.) The peculiar institutional situation of Aboriginal education is the result of a quirk in jurisdictional division between the provinces and federal government as well as a negative relationship between Aboriginals and mainstream education due to the historical legacy of assimilationist policies pursued by Canadian authorities. Many Aboriginal programs and institutions are growing much more rapidly than mainstream ones; nonetheless, most have lengthy institutional histories.

An example of an independent indigenous institution is University nuhelot’įne thaiyots’į nistameyimâkanak Blue Quills, which is not provincially chartered, unlike all other universities in Alberta but instead incorporated by federal statute. The institution was founded as an Indian residential school in the 1930s before being occupied by a protest movement in 1970 and then transferred to indigenous control in 1971. It was declared a university on September 1, 2015.

An example of indigenous institution federated with a larger university is First Nations University of Canada, which is part of the University of Regina.

An example of an indigenous accreditation body is the Indigenous Advanced Education and Skills Council.

Alberta

Higher education in Alberta trains students in various academic and vocational specializations. Generally, youth attend school from kindergarten until grade twelve, at which time they have the option to continue into post secondary study. Students are required to meet the individual entrance requirements for programs offered at the institution of their choice. Once accepted, students are allowed greater educational opportunities through the province extensively developed articulation system. The Alberta Council on Admissions and Transfer (ACAT) enables students transfer between programs at any of the twenty public post secondary institutions, eight private colleges, and other Alberta-based not for profit institutions. To ensure a continued high standard for credentials awarded by post secondary facilities, the Alberta Ministry of Advanced Education established the Campus Alberta Quality Council with membership in the International Network for Quality Assurance Agencies in Higher Education.

British Columbia

The provincial government administers a higher education system that includes twenty-five publicly funded institutions, fourteen private institutions, and numerous private career training institutions or career colleges. Public institutions include eleven universities, eleven colleges, and three institutes.

Much like the other regions in Canada, the educational system in British Columbia remained, for the most part, stagnant from the 1960s through the 1990s. During this period, education was divided into two main groups, the college and institution sector and the university sector. However, only the college and institution sector was able to issue a formal degree. In an effort to match the growth of technology, to expand the economy, and to raise attendance rates, this system was revised in 1991 when the New Democratic Party took over control of the central government. One main revision to the education system was a focus on vocationalism, which allowed education to be centred around industry specific skills rather than a generic curriculum. Since some vocational schools already existed, the New Democratic Party found it most logical to join the existing vocational schools and colleges into singular institutions along with enacting new programs. By 1995 five new universities were created offering a mix of vocational programs and generic degree programs. This not only increased the number of attendance spots therefore making a higher education more accessible, but it also made education more practical and applicable to careers after university. In addition, Vocational schools were also used to retrain current members of the workforce so they could adapt with technological changes and advancements. Now that more students had access to specialized vocational programs they were more adept to enter specific industries and could therefore enlarge economic growth and technological innovation.

Manitoba

A major public review of higher education in Manitoba, submitted in 1973 under the title of the Task Force on Postsecondary Education, more commonly known as the Oliver Commission, recommended closer articulation between Manitoba's universities and community colleges. The system remains a binary one, however, with few university transfer programs or college courses which can be applied towards a university degree. The Roblin Commission of 1993 and subsequent declining allocations of the public purse have made it clear that post-secondary institutions will have to find their own private sources of funding to make up shortfalls in general operating budgets.

New Brunswick

The higher education system in New Brunswick includes the governing Ministry of Postsecondary Education Training and Labour, related agencies, boards, or commissions, public or private chartered universities, universities recognized under the degree granting act, public colleges, and other institutions such as private career colleges. Higher education has a rich history in New Brunswick, including the first English-speaking University in Canada, University of New Brunswick, and the first university in the British Empire to have awarded a baccalaureate to a woman (Grace Annie Lockhart, B.Sc., 1875), Mount Allison University. English speaking New Brunswickers in Canada's only bilingual province are falling behind according to Statistics Canada.

Newfoundland and Labrador

Newfoundland and Labrador has had the same growing pains as other provinces in developing its own form of education and now boasts a very strong, although relatively small, system. The direction of Newfoundland and Labrador's policy has evolved rapidly since the late 1990s, with increased funding, participation rates, accessibility and transferability. Many of the directives the government has been acting upon in the past 3 years have been a result of recommendations that stemmed from a 2005 white paper: Foundation for Success: White Paper on Public Post-Secondary Education

Northwest Territories

The only post-secondary institution in the NWT is Aurora College. The former Arctic College was split into Aurora College and Nunavut Arctic College when Nunavut Territory was created in 1999. Aurora College has campuses in Inuvik, Fort Smith and Yellowknife. It has learning centres in many other communities in the NWT. The territorial Department of Education, Culture and Employment is the government agency responsible for post-secondary education in the Northwest Territories. There are two career colleges located in the NWT: the Academy of Learning in Yellowknife, which provides business information technology courses, and Great Slave Helicopters Flight Training Centre, which supplies Global Positioning System training for helicopter pilot education.

Nova Scotia

The governing body for higher education in Nova Scotia is the Department of Education with Karen Casey as Minister of Education. Nova Scotia has a population of less than 1 million people who are served by 11 public universities and one private chartered university authorized to grant degrees, the Nova Scotia Community College that offers programs at 13 campuses, and 6 Community Learning Centres.

Nunavut

Created in 1999, the Territory of Nunavut is located in the Canadian Arctic. Nunavut has developed some creative solutions to the delivery of post-secondary education considering challenges that include a huge geographic region, a sparse and isolated populace, and four official languages. To address these challenges, Nunavut Arctic College delivers customized learning programs via Community Learning Centres in twenty-four of the twenty-six communities in Nunavut. Programs are developed to address the needs of individual communities, with respect to literacy, adult education, certificates, and professional development for major regional community stakeholders, such as government, employers and non-profit organizations. To assist Northern residents in accessing highly skilled training, Nunavut Arctic College has partnered with McGill University, the University of Victoria and Dalhousie University to offer bachelor's degrees in Education, Nursing and Law, respectively. Nunavut Arctic College is an active member of the Alberta Council on Admissions and Transfer, and has developed formal transfer arrangements with many institutions in the Province of Alberta and Aurora College in the Northwest Territories.

Ontario

The higher education system in Ontario includes the governing Ministry of Training, Colleges, and Universities, advisory bodies, public universities, private degree-granting institutions, public colleges, private career colleges, and associations. In Ontario there are twenty-two public universities, twenty-four public colleges, and seventeen privately funded institutions with degree granting authority. Governance within Ontario universities generally follows a bicameral approach with separation of authority between a board and a senate. There are eight associations that provide representation for faculty, staff, institutions, and students within the Ontario higher education system. The public funding of higher education in Ontario primarily relies on cooperation between the government of Canada and the government of Ontario. Public funding of higher education involves direct public funding of institutions for instruction, investment, and research combined with funding of students.

Prince Edward Island

Higher education in Prince Edward Island falls under the jurisdiction of the Higher Education and Corporate Services Branch within the Department of Education and Early Childhood Development. The province has one university, the University of Prince Edward Island authorized to grant degrees and one community college, Holland College, that operates centres across the province including: the Culinary Institute of Canada, the Justice Institute of Canada, the Marine Centre, the Aerospace Centre, the Atlantic Tourism and Hospitality Institute and the Prince Edward Island Institute of Adult and Community Education.

Quebec

The higher education system in Quebec is unique when compared to the other Canadian provinces and territories. Students complete their secondary studies in their 5th year, which is the equivalent of the eleventh grade. Post-secondary studies start within a mandatory pre-university college system. A publicly funded college is called Collège d’enseignement général et professionnel (CEGEP). Private colleges exist but in much fewer numbers. In college, students keen on academic or highly skilled professions would take the university preparation program, while students interested in a skilled trade would take specialized programs at this level to prepare them for the workforce. Because College includes two years of academic study they essentially eliminate the freshman year of university. Programs in Quebec universities are more specialized, but students are required to complete only ninety credits for a Bachelors degree. Students from outside the province are required make up the first year either through a college, CEGEP, or at their chosen university. Although French is the official language at the provincial level, all students can access post-secondary education in both French and English.

Saskatchewan

The post-secondary sector includes 2 public universities, Aboriginal-controlled institutions that are affiliated to either one of the public universities, 1 polytechnic, 4 federated colleges, career colleges, 8 regional colleges, and Campus Saskatchewan govern by the Ministry of Advanced Education, part of the provincial government of Saskatchewan. Campus Saskatchewan, established in 2002 as a partnership with various post-secondary institutions to work together to use technology-enhanced learning to increase opportunities for the people in Saskatchewan to access high quality education and training at times and in places that best meet their needs. According to the 2014-15 budget report, The Ministry of Advanced Education received $817.8 million, an increase of $24 million or 3.7 per cent over last year to support operational increases and several key investments at post-secondary institutions. In addition, the ministry also offers non-payable funding through scholarships, grants and bursaries to eligible students. The Saskatchewan Institute of Applied Sciences and Technology (SIAST) received authorization to its first degree, a Bachelor of Psychiatric Nursing, the first of its kind in the province in July 2013. The following year on November, SIAST was renamed Saskatchewan Polytechnic (SaskPolyTech).

Yukon

Yukon's system of higher education is shaped by the territory's small population (30,375 people as of May 2006) in a relatively large geographic area. The history of higher education in fact went hand in hand with the establishment of a representative territorial government in 1979. The only post-secondary institute in Yukon, Yukon University, issues certificate, diploma, and degree programs to all high school leavers and older adults. It is the only university in northern Canada, and was previously Yukon College until 19 May 2020 when it became a university. The university provides Adult Basic Education/literacy programs as well.

Higher education associations and organizations

There are numerous groups that are relevant to the structure of higher education in Canada. These include those that support teachers, staff, students, institutions, research, and related groups involved in the delivery of higher education in the Canadian provinces and territories.

Accreditation 
Canada does not have an accreditation system to assess the quality of post-secondary schools, such as the United States' network of national and regional accreditation organizations. Membership in Universities Canada and government charters or legislation are substitutes but provinces/territories usually do not evaluate universities as rigorously as American accreditation organizations, and graduates of institutions that are not Universities Canada members sometimes find that universities in other provinces do not recognize their degrees.

Each Canadian university is autonomous in academic matters including policies and procedures of quality assurance of its programs, instructors and procedures. Membership in Universities Canada and the university's government charter are seen as serving in lieu of institutional accreditation, both in Canada and abroad. Eight Canadian provinces have established bodies to provide a second level of quality assurance at universities. Saskatchewan, Newfoundland and Labrador, and Yukon do not have provincial/territorial quality assurance agencies.

There are several unofficial rankings published on an annual basis by media such as Maclean's. Several other magazines like Times Magazine also regularly publish rankings.

Athabasca in 2006 became one of the first Canadian universities to receive American accreditation, when the Middle States Commission on Higher Education approved its application. After the Simon Fraser Clan became the first non-American team to join the American National Collegiate Athletic Association—which requires regional accreditation—Simon Fraser University applied to the Northwest Commission on Colleges and Universities (NWCCU) in 2008 and was granted accredited status effective . According to Simon Fraser, the university has accreditation with NWCCU because Canada does not have a comparable system. US accreditation will, the university stated, "simplify our relationships with US institutions, including government, foundations and collegiate sports associations", and "enhance the value of an SFU degree for alumni abroad and for international students returning home". In 2013 non-Universities Canada member Capilano University also received accreditation from the NWCCU, and Thompson Rivers University announced its intention to apply.

Higher education journals and publications
There are a number of journals and publications regarding higher education in Canada. The majority are published by associations of faculty, staff, or students.

 Academic Matters is a Canadian magazine which publishes articles on issues of relevance to post-secondary education in Canada and internationally, as well as literature and film reviews, original fiction, research notes and commentaries. This journal is published by the Ontario Confederation of University Faculty Associations and has a circulation of 24,000 readers, including professors, academic librarians and others interested in higher education issues across Canada.
 CAUT Bulletin is an electronic newsletter published by the Canadian Association of University Teachers (CAUT).
 The Canadian Journal of Higher Education is a journal published by the Canadian Society for the Study of Higher Education (CSSHE).
 Canadian Public Policy is a journal that examines Canadian economic and social policy published by the Canadian Economics Association.
  is a magazine published by Colleges & Institutes Canada (CICan), formerly known as Association of Canadian Community Colleges (ACCC).
 University Affairs is a magazine published by the Association of Universities and Colleges of Canada (AUCC).

Selected issues

Political views
A 2011 study found that Canadian university professors were left leaning but were not "hugely different in this respect from the Canadian university-educated population." There was considerable variation in political views, which suggests "that contemporary characterizations of the North American professoriate as left- or right-leaning tend to be overdrawn". Disadvantaged status and socialization in the field were important in forming these views but self-selection effects were not excluded.

Value of higher education
Canada ranks first among OECD nations in the number of college and university graduates. In 2016, Statistics Canada found that 54.0% of Canadians (aged 25–64) were college or university graduates. However, a 2016 labour market assessment by the Parliamentary Budget Officer reported that the underemployment rate for university undergraduates under the age of 35 worsened from 1991 to 2015. The equivalent rate for college graduates was similar until 2006. Since then it has fallen.

Below is a sortable table of overqualification percentages for undergraduates below the age of thirty-five, from a 2017 Statistics Canada study.

A 2017 study from Statistics Canada showed that, for women under the age of 35, the median annual pay of undergraduates ranged from $41,238 in the arts to $75,027 in nursing. For men, the figures ranged from $44,327 in the arts to $78,054 in engineering.

A 2017 study from Statistics Canada showed that, among men over the age of 24, the median annual pay of apprenticeship holders is $72,955 per year, which is 7% more than they would have received with a typical college diploma. Among women, the figure is $38,230, which is actually 12% less than if they had started work straight out of high school. This discrepancy is explained by the tendency for men to seek training in engineering-related trades, while women often seek training in service trades such as hairstyling. Four years after certification, median employment incomes for individual trades range from $21,000 for hairdressers to $107,220 for heavy equipment technicians.

A 2018 study from Statistics Canada found that median earnings for women with master's degrees range from $65,200 in the arts to $124,200 in the pharmacy field. For men, the figures range from $69,700 in the humanities to $138,200 in the pharmacy field. Fully one-quarter of all master's degrees are in business subjects, where they typically result in a 27% pay increase compared to bachelor's degrees. In health, education, the arts and the social sciences, the median increase is in the 14% to 17% range. In the STEM subjects, the increase is less than 10%. Finally, three out of five doctoral degrees are awarded in the STEM subjects.

A 2020 Study from Statistics Canada found that most top-earners among bachelor's degree graduates came from various engineering specialties: 6 of the top 10 disciplines among men, and 7 of the top 10 disciplines among women were in engineering. At the master's degree level, most top-earning graduates came from business programs. Doctoral graduates who received the highest pay graduated from various program areas such as business, health, engineering, social sciences, and education. At both the bachelor's and master's degree levels, the most fields associated with the lowest pay were in the arts or humanities. At the doctoral level, biology had the lowest pay rates.

See also

Academic ranks in Canada
Rankings of universities in Canada
List of universities in Canada
List of private universities in Canada
List of colleges in Canada
List of medical schools in Canada
List of law schools in Canada
List of business schools in Canada
List of Canadian universities by endowment

References

Further reading
Coates, Ken & Bill Morrison. Campus Confidential: 100 startling things you don't know about Canadian universities. Toronto, Lorimer, 2013. 
Coates, Ken & Bill Morrison. What to Consider If You're Considering University: New Rules For Education and Employment. Toronto, Dundurn, 2014. 
Coates, Ken & Bill Morrison. Dream Factories: Why Universities Won't Solve the Youth Jobs Crisis. Toronto, Dundurn, 2016. 
Cote, James & Anton Allahar. Ivory Tower Blues: A University System in Crisis. University of Toronto Press, 2007. 
Prevost, Kyle & Justin Bouchard. More Money for Beer and Textbooks: A Financial Guide for Today's Canadian Student. Winnipeg, Young and Thrifty Publications, 2013. 
Rybak, Jeff. What's Wrong with University: And How to Make It Work for You Anyway. Toronto, ECW Press, 2007.

External links
Statistics Canada studies of education, training and learning
Government of Canada career planning guide
Government of Canada job market trend analysis

 
Canada